Autostrada is the name used for a controlled-access highway in several languages. In English, it typically refers to the Autostrade of Italy.

Autostrada may also refer to:

By country
Roads and expressways in Romania
Roads and expressways in Poland
Part of the network of transport in Albania
Autoestrada, express roads in Portugal

See also
 Autoroute (disambiguation), the name used in French
 Autobahn (disambiguation), the name used in German
 Autopista (disambiguation), the name used in Spanish
 Atlantia (company), Italian company formerly called Autostrade
 Autostrad (band), Jordanian indie band